In economics, a virtual airline is an airline that has outsourced as many possible operational and business functions as it can, but still maintains effective control of its core business. Such an airline focuses on operating a network of air services, and outsourcing non-core activities to other organizations. Contracting out services within the aviation industry has reportedly become so common that many carriers could be classed as having features of a virtual airline, although it is arguable whether any current carriers meet a strict definition of the term.

The term is often used to describe travel companies and ticket agencies that market themselves as airlines, but do not possess an air operator's certificate and contract with one or more certificated operators to fly and maintain aircraft, often under an air charter arrangement. Although operated by others from a regulatory standpoint, the aircraft may display the virtual airline's livery, and may be owned or leased by that company.

Origins

Virtual airlines originated in the United States following the drastic changes brought about by the Airline Deregulation Act of 1978. During the hyper-competitive years immediately following deregulation, major airlines found it increasingly unprofitable to compete against start-up carriers on many routes they currently served. Instead of forfeiting the routes entirely, the larger carriers often made marketing arrangements with smaller airlines to fly under the "banner", or livery, of the larger airline. These regional airlines, mimicking the well known major airlines in adverts and purporting to make connections as seamless as possible, soon abandoned their own local service routes. In most cases, the regional airlines found it more profitable to serve the mainline hubs as a feeder operation rather than operate on their own.

List of virtual airlines

Africa
Cally Air
FlyNamibia
Lift

Europe
 Air Croatia (defunct)
 Air Leap (defunct)
 Air Norway (defunct)
 Air Prishtina
 AirGotland
 Airseven
 Alpeflyet (defunct)
 Alsie Express
 AnadoluJet
 Andorra Airlines
 Arctic Airlink (defunct)
 BRA Braathens Regional Airlines 
 Citywing (defunct)
 Color Air (defunct)
 CU Airlines
 Evolavia (defunct)
 Fly Marche (defunct)
 flyBAIR
 FlyNonstop (defunct)
 Global Reach Aviation
 Green Airlines (defunct)
 IGavion (defunct)
 Jetisfaction (defunct)
 Kosova Airlines
 Krohn Air (defunct)
 L'odyssey
 Level
 Lübeck Air
 Manx2 (defunct)
 MeerExpress (defunct)
 Melilla Airlines (defunct)
 MyWings
 Niceair
 Rhein-Neckar Air
 Sky Greenland (defunct)
 SkyAlps
 Skåneflyg
 Snowbird Airlines (defunct)
 Soder Airlines (defunct)
 Spanjet (defunct)
 Sveaflyg
 Sverigeflyg (defunct)
 Teddy Air (defunct)
 Trawel Fly (defunct)
 UEP!Fly
 Vildanden (defunct)
 Vizion Air
 Västflyg

North America

With mainline-type equipment
 Aeroflyer
 Amazon Air
 Cal Jet Air (defunct)
 Direct Air (defunct)
 Greyhound Air (defunct)
 Hooters Air (defunct)
 Midwest (defunct)
 OWG
 Peoplexpress (defunct)
 Roots Air (defunct)
 Sky Cana
 SkyValue (defunct)
 Tahoe Air (defunct)
 Western (defunct)

With regional-type equipment
 Air Canada Express
 Aleutian Airways
 American Eagle
Blade
 Branson Air Express (defunct)
 Buzz (defunct)
 Chalk's Ocean Airways (Post Flight 101) (defunct)
 Delta Connection
 Delta Shuttle
 FLOAT Shuttle
 Go! (defunct)
 Go!Express (defunct)
 JSX
 NewLeaf (defunct)
 OneJet (defunct)
 Ravn Connect (defunct)
 Southern Skyways
 Taos Air
 Ultimate Air Shuttle
 United Express

References

External links

Business terms
International business
Outsourcing
Civil aviation
Airline types